The Ula or I Ula Tavatava is a throwing war club from Fiji.

Uses in Fiji
Usually cut from a hardwood type of iron wood, it has a round end made up of the root knot and is sometimes called "pineapple club" for his particular shape. It can be launched or used as a club. Some types of Ula have a smooth head.

Gallery

Bibliography
 John Charles Edler, Terence Barrow, Art of Polynesia, Hemmeter Publishing Corporation, 1990.
 Jean-Edouard Carlier, Archipels Fidji - Tonga - Samoa: La Polynésie Occidentale, Voyageurs & curieux, 2005.
 Rod Ewins, Fijian Artefacts: The Tasmanian Museum and Art Gallery Collection, Tasmanian Museum and Art Gallery, 1982.

References

See also
 Totokia
 Gata 
 Sali
 Culacula
 Bulibuli

 
Throwing clubs
Clubs (weapon)
Primitive weapons
Ritual weapons
Fijian culture